Shambhavi (Sanskrit: शाम्भवी, IAST: Śāmbhavī), in Sanskrit means शिव प्रिय, meaning "Lord Shiva's Beloved". Shambhavi is the feminine of Shambhu, and can either be his wife (his other half that's feminine) or his daughter (that which came to be, directly from him). While Shambhu is a name of Lord Shiva, Shambhavi is a name of Goddess Durga.

It has a twofold meaning. It also entails to the yogic mahamudra "Shambhavi" - that which is assumed by Shiva. One of the South India Sambavar (Descendant of Lord Shiva) community people calls their women as Sambavi.

See also
 Shakti
 Sambavar

References

Durga
Mudras